In geometry an omnitruncated simplectic honeycomb or omnitruncated n-simplex honeycomb is an n-dimensional uniform tessellation, based on the symmetry of the  affine Coxeter group. Each is composed of omnitruncated simplex facets. The vertex figure for each is an irregular n-simplex.

The facets of an omnitruncated simplectic honeycomb are called permutahedra and can be positioned in n+1 space with integral coordinates, permutations of the whole numbers (0,1,..,n).

Projection by folding 

The (2n-1)-simplex honeycombs can be projected into the n-dimensional omnitruncated hypercubic honeycomb by a geometric folding operation that maps two pairs of mirrors into each other, sharing the same vertex arrangement:

See also
 Hypercubic honeycomb
 Alternated hypercubic honeycomb
 Quarter hypercubic honeycomb
 Simplectic honeycomb
 Truncated simplectic honeycomb

References 
 George Olshevsky, Uniform Panoploid Tetracombs, Manuscript (2006) (Complete list of 11 convex uniform tilings, 28 convex uniform honeycombs, and 143 convex uniform tetracombs)
 Branko Grünbaum, Uniform tilings of 3-space. Geombinatorics 4(1994), 49 - 56.
 Norman Johnson Uniform Polytopes, Manuscript (1991)
 Coxeter, H.S.M. Regular Polytopes, (3rd edition, 1973), Dover edition,  
 Kaleidoscopes: Selected Writings of H.S.M. Coxeter, edited by F. Arthur Sherk, Peter McMullen, Anthony C. Thompson, Asia Ivic Weiss, Wiley-Interscience Publication, 1995,  
 (Paper 22) H.S.M. Coxeter, Regular and Semi Regular Polytopes I, [Math. Zeit. 46 (1940) 380-407, MR 2,10] (1.9 Uniform space-fillings)
 (Paper 24) H.S.M. Coxeter, Regular and Semi-Regular Polytopes III, [Math. Zeit. 200 (1988) 3-45]

Honeycombs (geometry)
Polytopes
Truncated tilings